Atawhai Tupaea (born 3 February 1989) is a New Zealand rugby league footballer who played as a  for the New Zealand Warriors in the NRL Women's Premiership.

She is a New Zealand representative.

Background
Born in Auckland, Tupaea represented New Zealand in touch football before switching to rugby league.

Playing career
In 2014, Tupaea began playing for the Papakura Sisters and represented Counties Manukau. On 9 November 2014, she made her Test debut for New Zealand, scoring a try in their 12–8 win over Australia at WIN Stadium. On 28 January 2015, she was named the NZRL Women's Player of the Year.

In 2019, Tupaea returned to rugby league after a year off and was signed by the New Zealand Warriors NRL Women's Premiership team.

In October 2019, she was a member of New Zealand's 2019 Rugby League World Cup 9s-winning squad.

References

External links
NRL profile

1989 births
Living people
New Zealand people of Māori descent
New Zealand female rugby league players
New Zealand women's national rugby league team players
Rugby league centres
Rugby league wingers
New Zealand Warriors (NRLW) players